Mayasandra is a village in Turuvekere taluk in Tumkur District in Karnataka State in India. The place is one of the pancha-gramas (five settlements) of the Hebbar Shrivaishnavas and has an old temple of Mayamma which is revered by the Bestas and a shakti temple of Koollapuradamma, and a granite Jain temple of Parshwanath. The Lake of Mayasandra a big lake in the taluk. 

The Mahadeshvara temple is on a hillock nearby at a distance of about 3 km. The temple of Varadaraja of the Hoysala period is at Ramasagara which is about 4 km from this village.  

This village is one among villages planned by mysore kingdom

References

External links
http://wikimapia.org/1602547/TB-Corss-Mayasandra

Villages in Tumkur district